World Traveler is a 2001 Canadian-American drama film written and directed by Bart Freundlich, and starring Billy Crudup and Julianne Moore. It was screened at the 2001 Toronto International Film Festival.

Premise
The plot concerns a restless New Yorker named Cal who one day drives off into the open road, leaving his wife and infant son behind, and, along the way, meets a number of unusual characters. The film uses numerous songs by Willie Nelson.

Cast
Billy Crudup	... 	Cal
Julianne Moore	... 	Dulcie
Cleavant Derricks	... 	Carl
Liane Balaban	... 	Meg
David Keith	... 	Richard
Mary McCormack	... 	Margaret
Karen Allen	... 	Delores
James LeGros	... 	Jack
Francie Swift	... 	Joanie

Production
Filming took place in Alabama, Florida, and the Oregon towns of Pacific City and Enterprise.

Reception
The film has a 34% approval rating at Rotten Tomatoes, based on 67 reviews, with an average rating of 4.9/10. The site's critics consensus reads: "Heavy symbolism and an repulsive lead character make World Traveler seem like a long trip".

References

External links

2001 films
American drama films
Canadian drama films
English-language Canadian films
Films directed by Bart Freundlich
Films scored by Clint Mansell
Films shot in Oregon
Films shot in Alabama
Films shot in Florida
2001 drama films
2000s English-language films
2000s American films
2000s Canadian films